Ping Shek is one of the 37 constituencies of the Kwun Tong District Council. The seat elects one member of the council every four years. It was first created in Hong Kong district board elections, 1994 derived from Ping Shek & Kai Yip. The constituency boundary is loosely based on the Ping Shek Estate with estimated population of 16,446.

Councillors represented

Election results

2010s

2000s

1990s

Citations

References
2011 District Council Election Results (Kwun Tong)
2007 District Council Election Results (Kwun Tong)
2003 District Council Election Results (Kwun Tong)

Constituencies of Hong Kong
Constituencies of Kwun Tong District Council
1994 establishments in Hong Kong
Constituencies established in 1994